Hamilton Point is a flat-topped point marking the south side of the entrance to Markham Bay on the southeast side of James Ross Island, Antarctica. It was discovered by a British expedition under James Clark Ross, 1839–43, who named it "Cape Hamilton" after Captain William Baillie-Hamilton, Royal Navy, then private secretary to the Earl of Haddington, and later Second Secretary to the Admiralty. The point was first surveyed by the Swedish Antarctic Expedition under Otto Nordenskiöld, 1901–04, and resurveyed by the Falkland Islands Dependencies Survey in 1953, who considered "point" to be a more suitable descriptive term for the feature than "cape".

References

Headlands of James Ross Island